scopeArchiv is an archive information program that covers the hybrid records management as well as the digital preservation.

scopeArchiv covers the archival work process from accession to usage for public and private archives. It allows the OAIS conform and ISO 20652 based transfer of digital data to the archive. The software follows the international standards ISAD(G), ISAAR(CPF), ISDIAH, ISDF and the metadata standards EAD, Dublin Core and PREMIS. It is available in English, German and French.

The module scopeIngest (digital preservation) allows a gate to any archival storage products and works as interface between the description and the repository (e.g. Fedora Commons).

References 
 Andreas Berger, Eine vergleichende Untersuchung von Erschließungssoftware unter archivfachlichen und softwareergonomischen Gesichtspunkten Transferarbeit im Rahmen des Referendariats für den höheren Archivdienst, 38. Wissenschaftlicher Kurs, April 2005, Landesarchiv NRW – Staatsarchiv Münster, S. 46–78. pdf
 David Blanck e.a., Minimales Metadatenset und Musterprozess zur Digitalisierung und Übernahme analoger Bilder in scopeArchiv, scopeArchiv User Group. Arbeitsgruppe Bild, o.O. 2008.
 Christian Carron, Face au défi informatique. Archives cantonales, les archives de l'Etat du Valais se sont donné cinq ans pour transférer 45000 pages d'inventaires sur leur nouvelle base de données scopeArchiv, in: Nouvelliste 45/26 (2007).
 Thomas Fritz e.a., Ein einheitliches IT-System von der Überlieferungsbildung bis zur Online-Bestellung – MIDOSA 21 im Landesarchiv Baden-Württemberg, in: Der Archivar, 60. Jahrgang (2007), Heft 3, S. 220–228. pdf
 Detlev Heiden, Professionalisierung des Zugangs zu Erschließungsinformationen, in: Veröffentlichungen der Archivschule Marburg. Institut für Archivwissenschaft, Nr. 39 (2004), S. 100. online 
 Lambert Kansy, Aufbau einer Infrastruktur für die digitale Archivierung im Staatsarchiv Basel-Stadt. Werkstattbericht, in:  Neue Entwicklungen und Erfahrungen im Bereich der digitalen Archivierung: von der Behördenberatung zum Digitalen Archiv, München, Generaldirektion der Staatlichen Archive Bayerns 2010, S. 55–62.
 Manuel Kehrli, Neue Datenbank der Denkmalpflege Aargau, in: NIKE-Bulletin Nr. 4 (2011), Berne, S. 51.
 Manuel Kehrli, Monumental case with scopeArchiv. In: Tehničnih in vsebinskih problemih klasičnega in elektronskega arhiviranja, Maribor 2012 S. 559–561. online
 Marta Riess und Johannes Seidl, Das Bildarchiv des Archivs der Universität Wien wird digitalisiert – ein Werkstattbericht, in: Mitteilungen der VÖB 62 (2009) Nr. 1, Vienna, S. 7-17. pdf
 Christian Sieber, Vom Nutzen der Archivgeschichte am Beispiel Zürich. Vom städtischen Urkundenarchiv in der Grossmünstersakristei zur virtuellen Rekonstruktion in scopeArchiv, Zurich 2009.

External links 
 scope.ch

Library and information science software
2019 software